Ectodini is a tribe of cichlids that are endemic to Lake Tanganyika in East Africa. They live in the benthic zone. Most of the genera in this tribe are monotypic. These fishes show diverse morphology and behaviour and the tribe includes taxa which live in sandy, muddy and rocky habitats.

Genera
The following genera are classified in the tribe Ectodini:

 Aulonocranus Regan, 1920
 Callochromis Regan, 1920
 Cardiopharynx Poll, 1942
 Cunningtonia Boulenger, 1906
 Cyathopharynx Regan, 1920
 Ectodus Boulenger, 1898
 Grammatotria Boulenger, 1899
 Lestradea Poll, 1943
 Ophthalmotilapia Pellegrin, 1904
 Xenochromis Boulenger, 1899
 Xenotilapia Boulenger, 1899

References

External links

 
Pseudocrenilabrinae
Cichlid fish of Africa

Fish tribes